Thomas Henry Nelson (August 12, 1824 – March 14, 1896) was a U.S. diplomat and politician from Indiana.

Nelson was born in Minerva, Mason County, Kentucky to Dr. Thomas W. Nelson and Frances Doniphan Nelson. In 1844, Thomas married Elizabeth "Lizzie" Key, the daughter of Marshall Key and Harriet Sellman Key. She was a student of Harriet Beecher Stowe.

The Nelsons moved to Rockville, Indiana, where he set up a law practice. A few years later, the couple moved to Terre Haute, Indiana. In 1852 he was on the Board of Commissioners for the construction of the Springfield and Terre Haute Railroad. During the 1850s, he was tasked with organizing the Republican Party in Indiana. In 1860, he unsuccessfully ran for the United States Congress. He was appointed U.S. Envoy to Chile in 1861 by Abraham Lincoln. On December 8, 1863, he organized rescue operations during the catastrophic Church of the Company Fire in Santiago and was called "a true hero of Chile" for doing so.

He was made U.S. Envoy to Mexico from 1869 to 1873 by Ulysses S. Grant. Nelson died in Terre Haute, on March 14, 1896, and is buried there in Woodlawn Cemetery.

Notes

1824 births
1896 deaths
Politicians from Terre Haute, Indiana
People from Mason County, Kentucky
Indiana lawyers
19th-century American diplomats
Ambassadors of the United States to Chile
Ambassadors of the United States to Mexico
19th-century American lawyers